Ledothamnus is a genus of flowering plants belonging to the family Ericaceae. Its native range is Northern South America to Northern Brazil.

In 2012, the new tribe Bryantheae was proposed based on genetic analysis, containing the genera Bryanthus and Ledothamnus.

Species:

Ledothamnus atroadenus 
Ledothamnus decumbens 
Ledothamnus guyanensis 
Ledothamnus jauaensis 
Ledothamnus luteus 
Ledothamnus parviflorus 
Ledothamnus sessiliflorus

References

Ericaceae
Ericaceae genera